The women's middleweight is a competition featured at the 2019 World Taekwondo Championships, and was held at the Manchester Arena in Manchester, United Kingdom on 15 and 16 May. Middleweights were limited to a maximum of 73 kilograms in body mass.

Medalists

Results

Final

Top half

Bottom half

References
Draw
Results

External links
Official website

Women's 73
World